Marcus Davies is an Australian Rules Footballer who played with the Carlton Football Club in the (AFL)

Davies played his junior football with the Sandy Bay Lions Junior Football Club in Hobart, Tasmania, attending The Hutchins School. He represented Tasmania at the 2009 AFL National Under 18 Championships, and was noted for his endurance at the Draft Camp. He was selected by the Carlton Football Club in the 2009 AFL National draft with its third round selection (#43 overall). Davies has played both midfield and defence during his junior career.

Davies made his senior Carlton debut in Round 19, 2010 against Essendon. In his first two seasons with the club, Davies played 13 games for Carlton, and spent the rest of the time with Carlton's , the Northern Blues Football Club. He played only four games in the next two years, was delisted at the conclusion of the 2013 season.

After one season with Port Melbourne Football Club in the (VFL) in 2014, Davies joined the Tigers FC (Kingborough) in the Tasmanian State League starting in 2015, taking on a playing assistant coach role which he still holds as of 2021; he also took on the administrative role of operations manager at the club from 2020.

References

External links

Carlton Football Club players
Preston Football Club (VFA) players
1991 births
Living people
Australian rules footballers from Tasmania
North Hobart Football Club players
Port Melbourne Football Club players
Kingborough Football Club players